The siege of Malmö (Swedish: Belägringen av Malmö) was an unsuccessful Danish siege on the Swedish-held city of Malmö, fought between June 11 and July 5, 1677. Fought towards the end of the Scanian War, the siege was one in a string of Danish losses that saw Swedish forces under King Charles XI of Sweden establish control over the southern region of Sweden.

Prelude

The fortified city of Malmö was the only Swedish stronghold that had not fallen into the hands of the Danes during the 1676-1677 period of the Scanian War.  It was used as a base for Swedish operations in the southwestern corner of Scania. To win the war, it was important for King Christian V of Denmark to capture Malmö and strike a blow against Swedish presence in the region. The siege began on June 11, with the Danish navy anchoring in the roadstead north of the town and the Danish army camping on the plain south of the town. Danish engineers soon began digging trenches leading up to the castle in the west and to the eastern and southern gates on the city wall. On June 12, the Danes brought in 28 siege guns and 27 mortars, using them to start bombarding the castle and the city walls. 

The Swedish administration of Malmö was unsure of the loyalty of the local citizens, as they had only been under Swedish rule since 1658. But reports from Kristianstad about how Christian V had allowed his soldiers three hours of plunder after the capture of the town by the Danes in August 1676, convinced the local citizenry that their best option was to support the Swedes. The Swedish defense was under the command of General Fabian von Fersen, who served as the Swedish Chief Commander in the regions of Scania, Halland and Blekinge. During the siege, he suffered a head wound from Danish musket fire. Fabian died on July 30, following an unsuccessful operation.

Battle
The bombardment became more intense on the evening of June 25, and at 1 o'clock on the morning of June 26 the battle began with a diversionary attack on the Malmö Castle (Swedish:  Malmöhus slott), followed by two frontal assaults on the city, one at the southern gate (Söderport) and one at the eastern gate (Österport).

The Danes used fascines, ladders and pontoons to cross the moat. After fierce fighting Danish forces under the command of Siegfried von Bibow were able to break through the defense close to the eastern gate. However, as soon as Danish troops reached the crest of the town wall the Danish artillery ceased firing, which gave the Swedish defenders the opportunity to man their guns.  

The Swedish artillery soon began firing on Danish troops making their way across the moat, which inflicted several casualties on the advancing Danish troops and made it impossible for the Danes to bring reinforcements to von Bibow. Inside the town, von Bibow didn't have enough troops to force his way to the gate and open it, and eventually he and all his men were cut down by Swedish soldiers and civilians. Another attack on the other side of the eastern gate made it to the crest of the wall before being repulsed, while the attacks at the southern gate failed to even cross the moat.

After the failed siege, on July 5 the Danish army began its retreat north to the town of Landskrona, where they would engage the Swedish at the Battle of Landskrona.

Aftermath
The Danes had lost the initiative in the war, as well as some of its best troops in the region and some of its most talented commanders. It has been suggested that the latter consequence may have affected the outcome of the subsequent Battle of Landskrona (Swedish: Slaget vid Landskrona)  which followed on July 14. While the Danish navy had the upper hand over the Swedish, the siege was one of a number of Swedish victories on land that would, in the end, restore the status quo of Scania being under Swedish control.

References

Other sources
Isacson, Claes-Göran (2000)  Skånska kriget 1675-1679 (Historiska Media, 2000) 

Conflicts in 1677
Sieges involving Sweden
Battles involving Denmark
1677 in Sweden
History of Malmö
Scanian War
Christian V of Denmark